Quinsigamond Community College(colloq: QCC, Quinsig) is a public community college in Worcester, Massachusetts. It has an enrollment of over 7,000 students. Many students are enrolled in the college's transfer program, MassTransfer, with the intent of continuing on to a college or university in the state.

History
Founded in 1963, QCC occupies a campus within the Greendale neighborhood of Worcester, which was formerly owned by the Assumption Preparatory School. The college maintains twelve satellite campuses in locations such as nearby Marlborough and Southbridge.

QCC offers day, evening, and online classes, which include over sixty associate degree programs and over fifty certificate programs in nine course categories.

QCC has a Center for Workforce Development and Continuing Education, which offers low-cost training programs that enable individuals to learn new skills that can be applied on the job or used for future professional development. The Center works closely with local companies and organizations to meet specific organizational goals.

Accreditation

QCC is accredited by the New England Commission of Higher Education. Individual programs of study are also fully accredited by specific agencies such the American Dental Association, the American Occupational Therapy Association, the Commission on Accreditation of Allied Health Education Programs, the National Association for the Education of Young Children, and the National League for Nursing.

Athletics
QCC is part of the Massachusetts Community College Athletic Association, and competes in Division III of the National Junior College Athletic Association.

In 2010, QCC athletes became known as the Wyverns, after the legendary, two-legged dragon.

Notable faculty
 Fannie Gaston-Johansson, professor of nursing

Notable alumni
 Richie Barker, Major League Baseball player
 John Binienda, member of the Massachusetts House of Representatives
 Brooke Brodack, viral video comedian
 Jay Cutler, professional bodybuilder and four-time Mr. Olympia
 Rick Hayes, member of the Connecticut House of Representatives
 Michael Moore, member of the Massachusetts Senate
 Brian Skerry, photographer
 Tanyon Sturtze, Major League Baseball player

See also
Colleges of Worcester Consortium
Massachusetts Community College Athletic Association
List of NJCAA Division III schools
Eliminalia - used QCC's message boards

References

External links
 

1963 establishments in Massachusetts
Educational institutions established in 1963
Universities and colleges in Worcester, Massachusetts
Community colleges in Massachusetts
NJCAA athletics